The 1946–47 season was Stoke City's 40th season in the Football League and the 26th in the First Division.

After a seven year absence due to World War II, the Football League made a welcome return for the 1946–47 season. Stoke were boosted by their time in the war leagues where they used many younger players to speed up their development. So Stoke now with a squad full of talent went on to achieve the finest league season in the club's history as they were involved in their first real attempt at winning the English title. The season was expanded until June due to a poor winter weather wise and on the final day of the season Stoke needed to beat Sheffield United to claim their first league title, but with the unhappy Stanley Matthews now moved on to Blackpool, Stoke lost 2–1 and ended up in 4th position. The 1946–47 season finish of 4th is only matched by the performance by the Stoke team of the 1935–36 season.

Season review

League
After a seven-year break the Football League returned for the 1946–47 season. Stoke, relying on many of their wartime discoveries along with quite a few who had served the club before the war commenced, were confident of doing well, and manager Bob McGrory announced that his squad consisted of 45 players (19 of them  were amateurs) of which 22 were eventually used. As the season took its course a number of players were sold for a profit and the only signing McGrory made was that of 31 years old goalkeeper Arthur Jepson. McGrory indicated that with full-time training, his side would thrive and given the right coaching and facilities in which to train and reach peak fitness. And he was proved right, despite the team picking up one point in their first four matches, the side started to play as a unit and thanks to two unbeaten runs, a challenge was made for top spot.

By October the saga involving Stanley Matthews and McGrory reared its ugly head again this time after the manager had asked the England winger to 'prove his fitness' in the reserves. Matthews now living in Blackpool refused and he drifted in and out of the squad following the fall out. One of the worst winters of the 20th century gripped Britain in 1947 and consequently the football season was extended into June and indeed it was late in the season when Stanley Matthews again asked to leave. He was 32, and running his own hotel with his wife in Blackpool, and he named the club he wanted to join unsurprisingly it was the Bloomfield Road club Blackpool. Matthews was worried that his career had only four years left and wanted to end it near his business. Matthews' career would however continue for another 20 years.

The 1946–47 season came to a climax in mid June when Stoke visited Sheffield United. A victory at Bramall Lane would give Stoke the league title, anything less would hand the honour to Liverpool. Stoke took around 10,000 of their fans to Sheffield but it was the "Blades" who proved to be too sharp for Stoke as they scored twice and despite Alexander Ormston replying for Stoke the title bid was over. Stoke were awarded £110 'talent money' for their performance during the season.

FA Cup
Stoke beat Tottenham Hotspur and Chester both after replays before meeting Sheffield United who again proved be their bogey side winning 1–0 in front of 39,683 at the Victoria Ground.

Final league table

Results

Stoke's score comes first

Legend

Football League First Division

FA Cup

Squad statistics

References

Stoke City F.C. seasons
Stoke